Ahsanganj railway station is a railway station in Naogaon District, Rajshahi Division, Bangladesh. Jamindar Munshi Ahsanullah Mollah M.L.C established the station and then the station was named as the Atrai Ghat in the time of British rule but it was renamed after Munshi Ahsanullah Mollah (Founder) as Ahsanganj railway station. Then the station was built again by Mollah Abul Kalam Azad MP (Son of Munshi Ahsanullah Mollah).

See also
 Bangladesh Railway
 Santahar railway station
 Atrai Upazila

References

Railway stations in Naogaon District